SS William Rawle was a Liberty ship built in the United States during World War II. She was named after William Rawle, an American lawyer in Philadelphia. Rawle was appointed as United States district attorney in Pennsylvania, in 1791. He was a founder and first president of the Historical Society of Pennsylvania, president of the Pennsylvania Abolition Society, and for 40 years a trustee of the University of Pennsylvania.

Construction
William Rawle was laid down on 28 June 1942, under a Maritime Commission (MARCOM) contract, MCE hull 61, by the Bethlehem-Fairfield Shipyard, Baltimore, Maryland; sponsored by Mrs. Grace Tully, the private Secretary to President Roosevelt, and was launched on 19 August 1942.

History
She was allocated to A. H. Bull Steamship Company, on 29 August 1942. On 31 March 1947, she was sold for commercial use to the Baltimore Insular Line, for $544,506. On 6 June 1958, she ran aground on the Silver Bank. She was refloated and returned to San Juan, Puerto Rico, where she was scrapped in October 1958.

References

Bibliography

 
 
 
 

 

Liberty ships
Ships built in Baltimore
1942 ships